Ready for Love may refer to:

Music
Ready for Love (album), a 2009 Tata Young album
"Ready for Love" (Mott the Hoople song), a 1972 song by Mott the Hoople from All the Young Dudes, popularly covered by Bad Company
"Ready for Love", a 1987 song from Can't Wait to See the Movie by Roger Daltrey
"Ready for Love", a 1989 song from After the War by Gary Moore
"Ready for Love", a 2001 song from  Acoustic Soul by India.Arie
"Ready for Love" (Cascada song), a 2006 song by Cascada from Everytime We Touch
"Ready for Love" (Adam Brand song), a 2010 single by Adam Brand
"Ready for Love" (Blackpink song), a 2022 promotional single by South Korean girl group for video game PUBG Mobile

Film and television
Ready for Love (film), a 1934 film featuring an Oscar nominated cast and crew
Ready for Love (TV series), a 2013 reality TV series

See also
"Are You Ready for Love"
Are You Ready for Love?
I'm Ready for Love